Anton James "Butch" Stolfa (September 6, 1917 – March 8, 1976) was an American football and basketball and coach. He served as the head football coach at Augustana College in Rock Island, Illinois from 1947 to 1949, compiling a record of 14–7–3. Stolfa was also he head basketball coach at Augustana from 1947 to 1950, tallying a mark of 23–35.

Head coaching record

College football

References

1917 births
1976 deaths
American football defensive backs
American football quarterbacks
Augustana (Illinois) Vikings football coaches
Augustana (Illinois) Vikings men's basketball coaches
Chicago Bears players
Luther Norse football players
High school football coaches in Iowa
People from Cicero, Illinois
Players of American football from Illinois